Joseph Cripps (1765 – 8 January 1847) was the member of parliament for the constituency of Cirencester for the parliaments of 1806 to 1812 and 1818 to 1841.

Cripps was the son of Joseph Cripps, a cloth manufacturer in Cirencester, and his wife Hester (née Hall) Cripps. Cripps acquired a second cloth manufactory and expanded the family interests into brewing and banking. From 1825 until his death, he was a director of the Van Diemen's Land Company; by 1829 he was deputy governor and, from about 1838 to 1842, governor. Years later,  at the time of his death, the Law Times described his fortune as "enormous".

Cripps was a captain in the Cirencester Volunteers in 1798 and lieutenant colonel and commander in 1803.

He was elected to parliament in 1806 representing a group who wished to have a local man representing their interests instead of the London merchant Robert Preston. He was narrowly defeated in a three-way race in 1812, but was unopposed in 1818 and held the seat for the next 23 years until replaced by his fourth son, William Cripps, in 1841. He generally supported the Whigs and parliamentary reform.

Cripps married Elizabeth Harrison in 1786. They had three sons and two daughters. After her death in 1799, he married her sister, Dorothea Harrison, in 1801, and they had five sons and three daughters. His son William's son, Wilfred Joseph Cripps, was an antiquarian and expert on antique silver plate. Another grandson, William Harrison Cripps, was a notable surgeon.

Cripps was buried in the family vault in St. Catherine's Chapel in the Church of St. John the Baptist, Cirencester.

The Van Diemen's Land Company operated a schooner named the Joseph Cripps which sailed between Hobart or Launceston and Port Adelaide in the 1840s.

References 

1765 births
1847 deaths
Conservative Party (UK) MPs for English constituencies
Members of Parliament for Cirencester
Tory MPs (pre-1834)
UK MPs 1806–1807
UK MPs 1807–1812
UK MPs 1818–1820
UK MPs 1820–1826
UK MPs 1826–1830
UK MPs 1830–1831
UK MPs 1832–1835
UK MPs 1835–1837
UK MPs 1837–1841